Daniel Harcourt Galbraith (November 30, 1878 – October 30, 1968) was a provincial politician from Alberta, Canada. He served as a member of the Legislative Assembly of Alberta from 1921 to 1930 sitting with the United Farmers caucus in government.

Early life
Galbraith was born in 1878 in Guelph, Ontario. His grandfather was Daniel Galbraith, a former Member of Parliament. He took his post secondary education at Ontario Agriculture College where he met his wife and married her. They settled in the Vulcan, Alberta area in 1904. They had three sons Doug, Curly & Robert (Bob) Galbraith.

Galbraith was good friends with former Prime Ministers Richard Bennett and Arthur Meighen

Political career
In 1917, Galbraith ran for a seat to the House of Commons of Canada as a Non-partisan League candidate. It was a four way race in the electoral district of Bow River. He finished third losing to Howard Halladay.

Galbraith ran for a seat to the Alberta Legislature for the first time in the 1921 Alberta general election defeating former Liberal MLA John Glendenning in a hotly contested two way race to hold the seat for his party.

In 1926, Galbraith ran for a second term in office. He increased his popular vote slightly from the last election to win a three way race.

References

External links

1878 births
United Farmers of Alberta MLAs
Candidates in the 1917 Canadian federal election
Canadian people of Scottish descent
1968 deaths